Comitas gagei is an extinct species of sea snails, a marine gastropod mollusc in the family Pseudomelatomidae, the turrids and allies

Distribution
This extinct  marine species is endemic to New Zealand.

References

 Maxwell, P.A. (2009). Cenozoic Mollusca. Pp 232-254 in Gordon, D.P. (ed.) New Zealand inventory of biodiversity. Volume one. Kingdom Animalia: Radiata, Lophotrochozoa, Deuterostomia. Canterbury University Press, Christchurch.

gagei
Gastropods described in 1988
Gastropods of New Zealand